Bob Soltis (April 1, 1936 – June 26, 2009) was an American football defensive back. He played for the Boston Patriots from 1960 to 1961.

He died on June 26, 2009, in Chanhassen, Minnesota at age 73.

References

1936 births
2009 deaths
American football defensive backs
Minnesota Golden Gophers football players
Players of American football from Minneapolis
Boston Patriots players